The Romanian Antarctic Foundation is a Romanian research institute that manages Romania's Polar research in Antarctica. The Foundation is one of the partners working on the research icebreaker Aurora Borealis. It was created on 1995 and is administered by the Romanian Institute for Polar Research.

References

Romania and the Antarctic
Research institutes in Romania
Science and technology in Antarctica